Twice Born is a 1983 Soviet war film directed by Arkadi Sirenko.

Plot 
The film takes place in the White Sea in 1942. The film tells about the rookie Andrei Bulygin, who becomes an assistant of machine gunner on the ship, which is engaged in the delivery of soldiers and weapons to the fleet. When they set off, the Germans stoke the ship and only Andrei saved his life. Will he be able to withstand the cold and the German pilot attacking him?

Cast 
 Vyacheslav Baranov
 Georgiy Drozd
 Eduard Bocharov
 Nina Ruslanova
 Tatyana Dogileva
 Sergei Plotnikov	
 Viktor Miroshnichenko
 Yury Nazarov
 Gennadi Korolkov
 Nikolay Volkov

References

External links 
 

1983 films
1980s Russian-language films
Soviet war films
Soviet World War II films
Russian World War II films
World War II naval films
Eastern Front of World War II films
Films set in 1942